Dr María Verónica Espinosa Serrano is an Ecuadorian medical doctor who served as the Minister of Public Health of Ecuador from 2017 to 2019.

She studied medicine at Universidad Internacional del Ecuador before completing a master's degree at Universidad San Francisco de Quito. She was previously the  Deputy Minister of Governance and Health Surveillance.

She left her role in 2019 with thanks, but after some discussion over the short supply of some basic drugs.

References

Living people
Ecuadorian Ministers of Health
Universidad San Francisco de Quito alumni
Year of birth missing (living people)